Dipsas mikanii is a non-venomous snake found in Argentina, Paraguay, and Brazil.

References

Dipsas
Snakes of South America
Reptiles of Argentina
Reptiles of Paraguay
Reptiles of Brazil
Reptiles described in 1837
Taxa named by Hermann Schlegel